Hipperholme railway station served the village of Hipperholme in West Yorkshire, England.

History

Hipperholme railway station was opened by the Lancashire and Yorkshire Railway on 17 August 1850. The station closed to passengers on 8 June 1953 and to goods in 1966.
A campaign is under way to re-open the closed station or to have a new one built in the area to alleviate congestion in the Hipperholme area.
In August 2018, as part of a call for new stations on the Caldervale Line it was proposed that Hipperholme could reopen.

Route

References

External links 
 Hipperholme station on navigable 1947 O. S. map
 Hipperholme railway station in 1962 on flikr
 Hipperholme railway station booking office in 1963 on flikr
 Hipperholme railway station in L&YR days

Disused railway stations in Calderdale
Former Lancashire and Yorkshire Railway stations
Railway stations in Great Britain opened in 1850
Railway stations in Great Britain closed in 1953